Christopher Fitzgerald Droney (born June 22, 1954) is a former United States circuit judge of the United States Court of Appeals for the Second Circuit and former Judge of the United States District Court for the District of Connecticut.

Early life and education 

Born in Hartford, Connecticut, Droney received a Bachelor of Arts degree magna cum laude from the College of the Holy Cross in 1976 and a Juris Doctor from the University of Connecticut School of Law in 1979. While at law school, Droney was an editor of the Connecticut Law Review. He was in private practice in Hartford, Connecticut from 1979 to 1993, and was also deputy mayor of West Hartford from 1983 to 1985, and then Mayor of West Hartford from 1985 to 1989. He was the United States Attorney for the District of Connecticut from 1993 to 1997. While U.S. Attorney, Droney gave a presentation to the President and Attorney General in the East Room of the White House on strategies to reduce gang violence.

Federal judicial service

District court service
On June 5, 1997, Droney was nominated by President Bill Clinton to a seat on the United States District Court for the District of Connecticut vacated by Alan H. Nevas. Droney was confirmed unanimously by the United States Senate on September 11, 1997, and received his commission on September 18, 1997. His service as a district judge was terminated on December 1, 2011 when he was elevated to the United States Court of Appeals for the Second Circuit.

Court of appeals service
On May 4, 2011, President Barack Obama nominated Droney to serve on the United States Court of Appeals for the Second Circuit to replace Judge Guido Calabresi, who assumed senior status in 2009. On November 28, 2011, the United States Senate confirmed his nomination by a 88–0 vote. He received his commission on December 1, 2011. On April 15, 2019, Droney announced that he would assume senior status, beginning June 30, 2019. In August 2019, Droney announced that he would retire from the bench in January 2020 and resume private practice.

In 2021, Droney was appointed by the National Football League Management Council and the NFL Players Association the System Arbitrator for the League.

Notable cases 

As a United States District Judge Droney presided over such matters as a multi-district class action involving RICO and fraud charges in the national food service industry, the first sex trafficking criminal jury trial under the then-new federal child sex trafficking statutes, and the return of the famous television puppet Howdy Doody from private parties to the museum at the Detroit Institute of Arts.

While on the Court of Appeals, Droney authored the Ragbir opinion, which held that immigrants could not be deported in retaliation for their protected First Amendment speech, and Littlejohn v. City of New York, which eased the pleading standard for federal employment discrimination claims. He also provided the deciding vote for the Second Circuit in Windsor v. United States, which held that the Equal Protection Clause guaranteed the right of same-sex couples to marry, which was affirmed by the United States Supreme Court.  He also dissented from the denial of en banc in the Microsoft email case, arguing that federal prosecutors could obtain emails of Microsoft customers that were stored abroad. Droney also joined in the Knight First Amendment Institute v. Trump  opinion, which held that the President's Twitter account was a First Amendment-protected public forum and the President could not block unfavorable comments from that account, the panel opinion in CREW v. Trump, which held that the suit could proceed against President Trump for violation of the Constitution's emoluments clause for his profits from his hotels and restaurants, as well as the Vance v. Trump opinion, which held that the President's personal tax returns were not immune from production in response to a state grand jury subpoena.  He also joined the opinion which required the disclosure of the Jeffrey Epstein court documents.

References

External links 

1954 births
21st-century American judges
Judges of the United States Court of Appeals for the Second Circuit
Judges of the United States District Court for the District of Connecticut
Living people
Lawyers from Hartford, Connecticut
United States Attorneys for the District of Connecticut
United States court of appeals judges appointed by Barack Obama
United States district court judges appointed by Bill Clinton
University of Connecticut School of Law alumni
20th-century American judges